The Eastman Wind Ensemble was founded by conductor Frederick Fennell at the Eastman School of Music in 1952. The ensemble is often credited with helping redefine the performance of wind band music. At the time, concert bands used all of their players for every piece, regardless of the piece's original orchestration. If there was not a part for a specific instrument on a piece — for example, a contrabass clarinet or a string bass— the conductor or publisher would have an arranger add one or simply have that instrument double another instrument— the string bass could play the tuba part, for instance. Also, bigger was better, and even though there would normally be three clarinet parts, many university concert bands would have 20 or 30 clarinets, or more.

Fennell redefined the wind band by having one player on each part, using only the instrumentation for each piece specified by the composer. Fennell coined the term "wind ensemble" to refer to this specific kind of wind band. The repertoire of the group included standard concert band pieces, but also chamber music for winds, and the instrumentation varied as required. In contrast to typical concert band practice, the Eastman Wind Ensemble kept its focus on original wind music rather than orchestral transcriptions. The Eastman Wind Ensemble has premiered over 150 works, including works by composers Bernard Rands and Joseph Schwantner.

A series of commercial recordings on the Mercury label spread the influence of Fennell's wind ensemble concept far beyond the geographic reach of the group's concerts, and helped form a new generation of wind band educators and musicians far beyond Rochester.

In 1987, the Eastman Wind Ensemble was nominated for a Grammy Award for Best Classical Performance - Instrumental Soloist or Soloists (with or without orchestra) for its 1986 album Carnaval, a collaboration with trumpeter Wynton Marsalis.

Conductors 
Frederick Fennell - 1952–1961
A. Clyde Roller - 1962–1964
Donald Hunsberger - 1965–2001
Mark Scatterday - 2002–present

Selected discography
Carnaval (with Wynton Marsalis) (1987)
The Civil War: Its Music and Its Sounds (1990)
Danzante (2006)
 Igor Stravinsky: Octet; L'Histoire du Soldat (2013)

See also 

 Tokyo Kosei Wind Orchestra

References

External links
Eastman Wind Ensemble
American instrumental musical groups
Musical groups established in 1952
Musical groups from Rochester, New York
Concert bands
Wind bands
Summit Records artists
1952 establishments in New York (state)
Centaur Records artists